Henny Kroeze (born 11 March 1952) is a retired Dutch motorcycle racer who competed in speedway. Kroeze is a ten times Dutch speedway champion. He was also finalist in the Individual Speedway World Championship twice; in 1983 and 1987. Kroeze was the first Dutchmen to reach the final standing of this championship. He was also the first person to ever score the maximum 21 points during a team league match. Henny achieved this on 21 August 1976 when Halifax (the British club he was riding for at the time) beat Birmingham 51 – 27.
Since his retirement from racing he has taken over Hell on Wheels, a Wall of death carnival side show.

References

External links
 Official website 
 HISTORY SPEEDWAY and LONGTRACK
 Grasstrack GB Henny Kroeze

1952 births
Living people
Dutch speedway riders
Dutch motorcycle racers
People from Borne, Overijssel
Halifax Dukes riders
Bristol Bulldogs riders
Sheffield Tigers riders
Sportspeople from Overijssel
Dutch expatriate sportspeople in England
20th-century Dutch people